Metapa was a town in ancient Aetolia, situated on the northern shore of Lake Trichonis, at the entrance of a narrow defile, and 59stadia from Thermum. It was burnt by Philip V of Macedon, on his invasion of Aetolia, in 218 BCE, as he returned from the capture of Thermum.

Its site is located near the modern Analipsis.

References

Populated places in ancient Aetolia
Former populated places in Greece